The 1964 Northeast Louisiana State Indians football team was an American football team that represented Northeast Louisiana State College (now known as the University of Louisiana at Monroe) in the Gulf States Conference during the 1964 NCAA College Division football season. In their first year under head coach Dixie B. White, the team compiled an 0–8 record.

Schedule

References

Northeast Louisiana
Louisiana–Monroe Warhawks football seasons
College football winless seasons
Northeast Louisiana State Indians football